Diacalymene is a genus of trilobite from the order Phacopida, suborder Calymenina. It includes the species D. ouzregui, D. clavicula, D. diademata and D. gabrielsi. It lived in the Ordovician and Silurian periods.

Distribution 
Fossils of the genus have been found in:

Ordovician
 Cabano, Jupiter and White Head Formations, Quebec, Canada
 Dufton Shale, United Kingdom

Silurian
 Lipeón Formation, Argentina
 Cariy Sandstone, Paraguay
 Motol and Zelkovice Formations, Czech Republic
 Henryhouse Formation and St. Clair Limestone, United States

References 

Calymenidae
Ordovician trilobites
Silurian trilobites
Ordovician first appearances
Silurian extinctions
Trilobites of North America
Paleozoic life of the Northwest Territories
Paleozoic life of Quebec
Fossils of Canada
Silurian trilobites of South America
Silurian Argentina
Fossils of Argentina
Silurian Paraguay
Fossils of Paraguay
Fossil taxa described in 1927